The Tribe is a science fiction drama television series which premiered on Channel 5 in the United Kingdom on 24 April 1999. The series was created by Raymond Thompson and Harry Duffin, and was developed and produced by the Cloud 9 Screen Entertainment Group in New Zealand. The series was commissioned by Channel 5, who received the initial screening rights. The series made its New Zealand premiere in 2000 on TV4.

Primarily aimed at teenagers, The Tribe is set in a post-apocalyptic city in which all adults have been killed as the result of an unknown virus. The series focuses on the remaining children and teenagers who must navigate the social and personal issues of adolescence, while being faced with the larger problems of a society in a state of anarchy. The inhabitants of the city form social groups, or tribes, with the focus of the series on the Mall Rats, who fight to survive among other threatening tribes such as the Locos. Overarching themes include the focus on change from tradition, empowerment, religion, and the exploration of power and corruption. The series was filmed in Wellington, New Zealand.

The series ran for 260 episodes and aired its final episode on 6 September 2003. A sequel series entitled The New Tomorrow was commissioned by Channel 5 and the Seven Network in Australia and first aired in 2005. It depicted the descendants of characters from The Tribe and was aimed at a younger audience. The Tribe experienced a resurgence in popularity after screening on ABC3 in Australia in 2009. This led to Cloud 9 developing a series of novels to continue the story of the television series, the first of which was released in 2011.

Plot

Series 1
In a post-apocalyptic city, all of the adults have been killed as a result of an unknown virus, leaving the children and teenagers to survive in a state of anarchy. Several social groups, or tribes, have formed, including the "Locos", an unruly tribe controlling the city under the leadership of Zoot, who is later accidentally killed. On the streets, Amber and Dal lead a group of children to safety and take refuge in an abandoned shopping mall, forming a new tribe called the "Mall Rats". They are joined by Bray and Trudy, who is pregnant; Bray's brother, Zoot, is the father. The tribe learns to solve issues including food and water shortage. A second wave of the virus strikes the city, and the tribe tries searching to find an Antidote. They travel to a base called Eagle Mountain, where a pre-recorded message confirms the Antidote's existence.

Series 2
At Eagle Mountain, Amber and Zandra, who is pregnant, are killed in an explosion. The tribe continues searching for an antidote to the virus and are successful, with Tai-San becoming the only one aware of the formula to produce it. Under Bray's leadership, the Mall Rats use their position of power to unite the other tribes and bring peace to the city. A bill of rights is developed by Danni, along with a trading market in the mall, and a newsletter by Ellie detailing the city's progress. The virus is later diminished, and a new tribe called the "Chosen" surfaces, they are remnants of the Locos who now worship Zoot as their god.

Series 3
The Chosen take control of the city, led by the Guardian and the "Supreme Mother", who is a brainwashed Trudy. The Mall Rats are captured and, along with other prisoners of the city, are given the choice to join the Chosen or work as slaves, with many civilians being sent away due to rebellion. After escaping, Bray, Ebony, Lex and Dal encounter the Eco tribe and discover that its leader is Amber, whose death had been faked by Ebony. The Eco tribe join the revolt and the remaining Mall Rats recruit other tribes to their side. The Chosen are overthrown, and Ebony is elected as city leader though manipulation; she banishes Bray and Amber for speaking against her as a mysterious plane invades the city.

Series 4
The city is invaded and conquered by a group of paratroopers, who are called the "Technos" and possess advanced technology. Ebony maintains control of the city through a deal with the Technos general, Jay. After Bray is captured, Trudy helps Amber give birth on the outskirts of town. They flee to the Ecos, then later rejoin the Mall Rats. In an attempt to create a utopia, the leader of the Technos, Ram, releases a virtual game to which the people of the city become addicted to in exchange for workload. Ebony and Jay betray Ram and escape the city. The Mall Rats defeat Ram with the assistance of Ram's lieutenant, Mega.

Series 5
Mega becomes the new leader of the Technos, and plans to take over the city. He orders everyone to be branded with a barcode and set to manual labour. Ebony is manipulated by virtual reality to believe that Zoot is alive. The Mall Rats try to learn the location of their members who were removed by the Technos. Ram is rescued by a vagabond, Slade, who takes him to the country town Liberty. Amber and Jay lead an attack against the city, capturing Mega. Ram infiltrates Mega's technology and creates an artificial intelligence program, which goes rogue and releases a new virus. The Mall Rats and their allies evacuate the city by boat.

Characters

Notes

Production

Development

Discussion which led to the creation of the series began when Raymond Thompson, co-founder of the independent production company Cloud 9 Screen Entertainment Group, known for his work as a screenwriter on the soap Howards' Way, was approached by Nick Wilson of Channel 5 to "develop a soap for the millennium, targeting a child/adolescent market". Thompson recalled an idea that he had in the 1980s about a world without adults, run by tribes of children and teenagers. Having already worked with writer Harry Duffin on several occasions, Thompson contacted him in November 1997 to work with him on further developing the concept for Cloud 9. They commissioned and recruited a team of ten writers to adapt the storylines and by July 1998 the first four scripts of The Tribe were finished.

Pre-production for series one started in June 1998 and filming began in August 1998. Principal photography was completed in March 1999 and the first episode premiered on Channel 5 on 24 April 1999. By June 2001, it was the broadcaster's "leading children's programme".

The show's official website played a role in further development of The Tribe. Viewers used the website to discuss the show in a forum. Thompson revealed that he used viewer response for audience research which helped develop additional stories.

Filming
The cast and crew amounted to between 400 and 500 people on each series of The Tribe. Filming of each series took about four to six months, chiefly in two studios at Cloud 9's production centre in Wellington, New Zealand. The permanent set of the "Phoenix Shopping Mall" was located in Studio A. This large set took five weeks to build prior to the commencement of principal photography and was said to be the largest set built for a production in New Zealand at the time. All of the shops contained in the Mall were built to almost realistic shop size specifications and designed to last for a long time.

Studio B housed the sewers that the Mall Rats use to secretly escape the Mall, as well as temporary structures that were built for scenes outside the Mall. Between the filming of the second and third series of The Tribe, the Mall set was repainted and redressed for use on another Cloud 9 production, Atlantis High.

Scenes of The Tribe were also shot on location in and around Wellington. For example, the Cloud 9 Studios car park was used as the exterior of the Mall and Alice's and Ellie's farmhouse was built in the rural area of Whitemans Valley in Upper Hutt. At times, over some weekends, the crew closed off Wellington streets to shoot scenes that took place in the desolate city streets.

Casting
Most of the cast had agents prior to the casting in 1998, as they had already worked on productions that were filmed in New Zealand, such as Xena: Warrior Princess, Hercules: The Legendary Journeys or Mirror, Mirror II.

Many of the actors had worked with Thompson on other Cloud 9 productions before they auditioned for The Tribe. Jennyfer Jewell (Ellie) and Ryan Runciman (Ryan) had worked on The Enid Blyton Adventure Series in 1996 and Jewell had also starred in The Enid Blyton Secret Series in 1997 alongside Daniel James (Zoot). Beth Allen (Amber) and Michael Wesley-Smith (Jack) had been cast in The Legend of William Tell in 1998. Many cast members from series one had acted in William Shatner's A Twist in the Tale in 1999.

The majority of the actors cast in series one were students and were tutored between scenes at Cloud 9's production centre. The underage cast members stayed in the "Cast House" for the duration of the shoot and were accompanied by chaperones on set.

Cancellation
Pre-production for series six started in September 2003 and a script for a Tribe movie was written and put on the market. The scripts for the first two episodes of series six were included on the Series 5 DVD box set (released in 2006), and told the story of the Mall Rats as they arrived on an unknown island.

However, Nick Wilson and Thompson decided that although "the show was still performing well, [they] felt that the cast was getting too old [and that] it was beginning to stretch the core proposition." Some of the cast and crew members went on to work on other productions.

Release

Broadcast
Series one of The Tribe premiered in the United Kingdom on 24 April 1999 on Five (Channel 5). It was broadcast on Channel 5 every Saturday. The final two episodes of The Tribe were shown on 6 September 2003 on Five.

The Tribe began airing in New Zealand in 2000 on TV4.

In the United States, The Tribe premiered on 1 December 1999 on Encore WAM! Channel. WAM! remained the program's exclusive US broadcaster throughout its run.

In Australia, The Tribe returned to television through its broadcast on ABC3 in 2010. The third series was aired due to popular audience demand and the program was repeated until 2012.

Home media and streaming services
Series one was first released in 2003 by Sanctuary Entertainment. Two years later, Revelation Films purchased the rights to the show and released all five series throughout 2006.

The first series of The Tribe was released on DVD in Australia by the ABC on 3 March 2011 after airing on ABC3. Dwayne Cameron appeared at promotional release events.

In 2012, Shout! Factory released the first series of The Tribe in the US through two volumes. Questar Entertainment released the first volume in a region-free format in 2018.

All five seasons of the program were released to Vimeo in 2018. They were also made available on the New Zealand video-on-demand service Lightbox.

Sequels and other potential followups

During pre-production for the planned series six of The Tribe, Channel 5 and Cloud 9 created a sequel television series, The New Tomorrow. Twenty-six episodes were produced, which aired in 2005 on the Seven Network in Australia and on Five in the United Kingdom. The series was also filmed in Wellington, with twenty core cast and up to a hundred crew members, including a large number who had worked on Peter Jackson's's King Kong. Many themes and storylines intended for The Tribes series six were used and adapted for the new series. It was set further in the future and followed the story of four Tribes: the Ants, the Barbs, the Privileged and the Discards.

Before the series was cancelled, Raymond Thompson had been working on screenplay for a Tribe movie in 2003. He mentions that the movie is "a backstory. The lead up to the virus. And how cities of children came about... but lots more as well." It was also mentioned to be in the third draft before it was shelved due to the show's cancellation. In 2011, The Tribe movie, named Tribes, was finally announced to be in development with the partnership of Legendary Pictures. Raymond Thompson revealed he had been working with Rob Cohen and Jason Rothenberg, the latter went on to produce The 100. But in 2015, the project fell through due to creative differences. Since 2015, Raymond Thompson has still been trying to produce a sequel and a motion picture, but is unable to say more details due to non-disclosure agreements.

The series has continued in novel format starting in 2011 with the release of The Tribe: A New World, effectively becoming the equivalent of series 6. In 2014, The Tribe: A New Dawn was released, effectively becoming the equivalent of series 7. In 2019, The Tribe: (R)Evolution was released, effectively becoming the equivalent of series 8.

Other media

Books
Several books based on the series were published in English:

 
 
 

In addition, three novels that serve as sequels to and a continuation of the story from the television series have been published:

 
 
 

Several books related to The Tribe have also been published in German.

Music
Two CDs were released, featuring music from the soundtrack of the television series and songs recorded by the cast. Abe Messiah was released on 7 November 2000 in New Zealand and on 19 March 2001 worldwide. A reissued version of the album, entitled Abe Messiah: Remix, was released in Germany in 2003. It also featured three music videos: "Abe Messiah", "You Belong to Me" and "This Is the Place". The Tribe released their music via a deal with UK label Sanctuary Records.

References

External links

 
 
 

 
1990s British children's television series
2000s British children's television series
1999 British television series debuts
2003 British television series endings
2000s New Zealand television series
2000 New Zealand television series debuts
2003 New Zealand television series endings
Channel 5 (British TV channel) original programming
English-language television shows
New Zealand children's television series
New Zealand science fiction television series
Post-apocalyptic television series
Teen drama television series
Television series about viral outbreaks
Television shows filmed in New Zealand